Harry Stern Airport  is a public use airport in Richland County, North Dakota, United States. It is located one nautical mile (1.85 km) south of the central business district of Wahpeton, North Dakota and owned by the Wahpeton Airport Authority.

Although many U.S. airports use the same three-letter location identifier for the FAA and IATA, Enterprise Municipal Airport is assigned BWP by the FAA and WAH by the IATA (which assigned BWP to Bewani, Papua New Guinea).

Facilities and aircraft 
It has two runways: 15/33 is 5,100 by 75 feet (1,554 x 23 m) with a concrete surface; 3/21 is 3,254 by 150 feet (992 x 46 m) with a turf surface.

For the 12-month period ending December 3, 2003, the airport had 10,860 aircraft operations, an average of 29 per day: 92% general aviation and 7% air taxi and 1% military. At that time there were 66 aircraft based at this airport: 83% single-engine, 8% multi-engine, 1% helicopter and 8% military.

References

External links 
 Aerial image as of September 1997 from USGS The National Map
 

Airports in North Dakota
Buildings and structures in Richland County, North Dakota
Transportation in Richland County, North Dakota